Accounts Chamber of the Russian Federation is the parliamentary body of financial control in the Russian Federation.

History
The prototype of the Accounts Chamber of the Russian Federation was the Chamber-collegium established by Peter I in 1718 for the management of state taxes and some sectors of the state economy. Prior to that time, the treasury of Russian tsars was a mess. The founder of the Court of Auditors Petr Lukich Aksenov. In 1719, he introduced to the Russian government the written balance of income and expenditure of money in the state treasury, and gave the Emperor a weekly report of capital flows. Moreover, Petr Aksenov defined the form of accounting for the Chambers-collegium and teach it local clerk and officials from all Russia.  In 1725, the Senate determined Peter Aksenov kamerirom, and in 1731 Secretary.

From 1811 to 1918 in Russian Empore exists office of State Comptroller. Then it was replaced by People's Commissariat of same name and in 1920 by Rabkrin

Status
Status of the Accounting Chamber of the Russian Federation by the Constitution of Russia and the Federal Law "On the Accounts Chamber of the Russian Federation", according to which the Accounts Chamber of the Russian Federation is a permanent body of financial control, which is formed by the Federal Assembly, the bicameral parliament of Russia and accountable to him. The work of The Chamber is guided by federal law, carries out the assignments of the Federation Council and the State Duma. As part of its objectives Chamber has the organizational and functional independence. It is the supervisory body of the Federal Assembly, but is not a structural unit and formally applies to the legislative, executive or judicial branches of government.

Structure
Chairman and half of (six auditors) Accounts shall be appointed by the State Duma, Vice-President and the other half of (six auditors) - Council of the Federation. Audit Chamber composed of a body and the unit. Board considers the organization of work, as well as reports and messages. Chairman (or in his absence - his deputy) manages the Accounting Chamber, organizes its work, auditors led by certain activities. The apparatus consists of the inspectors (who directly organize and carry out control) and other staff members.

Internal matters of the Chamber, the distribution of responsibilities between auditors Court of Auditors, the Apparatus of the Accounts Chamber of Russia and the interaction of the structural units of the Accounting Chamber, the order of business, development and implementation activities of all kinds and forms of control, and other activities are regulated by the Accounting Chamber, approved by its Board.

Chairmen

2022–2023 Chairman appointment
Due to the 2020 constitutional reform, the chairman will be appointed by the Federation Council for the first time, and not by the State Duma.

Below is a list of persons who, according to media reports, are considered as candidates for the post of Chairman of the Accounting Chamber.

Konstantin Chuychenko, Minister of Justice of Russia;
Dmitry Kozak, Deputy Kremlin Chief of Staff, former Deputy Prime Minister of Russia, former Minister of Regional Development of Russia;
Andrey Kutepov, R.F. Senator form St. Petersburg, Chairman of the Federation Council Committee on economic policy;
Andrey Makarov, Member of the State Duma, Chairman of the State Duma Committee on budget and tax;
Vyacheslav Makarov, Member of the State Duma;
Dmitry Rogozin, former CEO of Roskosmos, former Deputy Prime Minister of Russia, former Member of the State Duma;
Alexander Zhukov, Member of the State Duma, First Deputy Chairman of the State Duma;

See also
Federal budget of Russia

References

Politics of Russia
Russia
Supreme audit institutions